Whitehorse Transit is a city-owned transit company serving Whitehorse, Yukon. It operates Monday to Saturday. There is no service on Sundays and holidays, and except for Saturdays, service ends at 10 p.m.

They also operate a door-to-door Handy Bus service for people with disabilities.

The transit system was founded in 1975 and went into service early in 1976 as the Women's Minibus Society but was taken over by the city by 1981.  The system was originally established with five Fleury mini-buses, painted a lime green on white, the only colour that would show through snow, fog and rain.

By 1980, the system had retired some of the Fleury buses and replaced them with Superior school-bus type mini-buses, and in 1981, an Orion bus from Ontario Bus Industries was the first full-sized transit bus to operate in the city, arriving in time to be used for a world skiing championship. Two more Orions were purchased and the remaining Fleury buses were retired, with one now in the Yukon Transportation Museum. During a period of austerity, a GM Diesel bus was purchased from Hay River, and through the mid-1980s, more Orions were purchased from Calgary Transit, which was downsizing due to a recession. The remaining mini-buses were retired, and the fleet is now all full-sized buses, though some have called for the system to return to mini-buses.

During the mid-1980s, the colour scheme, which had changed from lime green to a more natural green, was changed to a red colour on the white.

The transit terminal was long located on Ogilvie Street between Third and Fourth Avenues, but from June 21, 1998, to January 3, 1999, the terminal was located on Range Road at the Takhini Arena; complaints by riders and Takhini subdivision residents led to city council ordering a return to Ogilvie Street.

Buses move from route to route as part of their schedule, rather than following the same route for an entire day. This allows riders in many cases to continue onto a different route without changing buses.

Routes
There are currently six scheduled bus routes.

Fleet

 Nova Bus LFS
 Dynamic Bus Specialty Vehicles Arboc Mobility Bus

See also

 Public transport in Canada

References

https://www.whitehorse.ca/departments/transit/schedules-and-information

External links
Whitehorse Transit

Transport in Whitehorse
Transit agencies in Yukon